January 6 - Eastern Orthodox liturgical calendar - January 8

All fixed commemorations below are observed on January 20 by Orthodox Churches on the Old Calendar.

For January 7th, Orthodox Churches on the Old Calendar commemorate the Saints listed on December 25.

Feasts
 Afterfeast of the Theophany of Our Lord and Savior Jesus Christ.

Saints
 Synaxis of the Holy Prophet, Forerunner and Baptist Saint John.<ref name=OCA-John>Synaxis of the Holy Glorious Prophet, Forerunner and Baptist John. OCA - Feasts and Saints.</ref>
 Saint Julian the Deacon, of Aegina (391)

Pre-Schism Western saints
 Saint Crispin, Bishop of Pavia in Italy, he signed the acts of the Council of Milan (467).
 Saint Valentine, an abbot who became a bishop in Rhaetia (470)
 Saint Brannock of Braunton (Brannocus, Brynach), England (6th century)St Brannock of Braunton. OCA - Feasts and Saints.  (see also: June 26)
 Saint Cedd, Bishop of Lastingham (664)Great Synaxaristes:  Ὁ Ἅγιος Σεντ Ἐπίσκοπος Σκωτίας. 7 Ιανουαρίου. ΜΕΓΑΣ ΣΥΝΑΞΑΡΙΣΤΗΣ.  (see also: October 26)
 Saint Cronan Beg, a Bishop of Aendrum in County Down in Ireland (7th century)
 Saint Tillo of Solignac (Thillo, Thielman, Théau, Tilloine, Tillmann) (702)
 Saint Kentigerna, Hermitess of Loch Lomond (734).January 20 / January 7. HOLY TRINITY RUSSIAN ORTHODOX CHURCH (A parish of the Patriarchate of Moscow).
 Saint Emilian (Émilion, Aemilio), born in Vannes, he was a monk at Saujon near Saintes, and died as a hermit in the forest of Combes near Bordeaux (767)
 Blessed Widukind (Wittekind, Wittikind, Wittikund) of Westphalia (807)Widukind. Ökumenisches Heiligenlexikon.
 Saint Aldric of Le Mans (Aldericus, Audry), Bishop of Le Mans in France, from 832 (856)
 Saint Reinold (Rainald, Reynold), monk at the monastery of St Pantaleon in Cologne in Germany (960)
 Saint Anastasius of Sens, Archbishop of Sens (977)

Post-Schism Orthodox saints
 Saint Feodor I of Russia (Fyodor (Theodore) I Ivanovich), last Rurikid Tsar of Russia (1598)
 New Martyr Athanasius of Attalia and Smyrna (1700)Great Synaxaristes:  Ὁ Ἅγιος Ἀθανάσιος ὁ Νεομάρτυρας ἐξ Ἀτταλείας. 7 Ιανουαρίου. ΜΕΓΑΣ ΣΥΝΑΞΑΡΙΣΤΗΣ.

New martyrs and confessors
 New Hieromartyr Alexander Skalsky, of Alma-Ata, Protopresbyter (1933){{#tag:ref|See:  СКАЛЬСКИЙ АЛЕКСАНДР ФИЛИМОНОВИЧ. Открытая православная энциклопедия "Древо" (Open Orthodox Encyclopedia "The Tree").|group=note}}
 New Hieromartyr Paphnutius (Kostin), Hieromonk of Optina Monastery (1938)
 New Hieromartyr Basil, Priest (1939)
 Martyr John (1940)
 Martyr John (1942)

Other commemorations
 The Miracle of Saint John the Baptist in Chios (1740)

Icon gallery

Notes

References

Sources
 January 7/January 20. Orthodox Calendar (PRAVOSLAVIE.RU).
 January 20 / January 7. HOLY TRINITY RUSSIAN ORTHODOX CHURCH (A parish of the Patriarchate of Moscow).
 January 7. OCA - The Lives of the Saints.
 The Autonomous Orthodox Metropolia of Western Europe and the Americas (ROCOR). St. Hilarion Calendar of Saints for the year of our Lord 2004. St. Hilarion Press (Austin, TX). p. 6.
 January 7. Latin Saints of the Orthodox Patriarchate of Rome.
 The Roman Martyrology. Transl. by the Archbishop of Baltimore. Last Edition, According to the Copy Printed at Rome in 1914. Revised Edition, with the Imprimatur of His Eminence Cardinal Gibbons. Baltimore: John Murphy Company, 1916. pp. 7–8.

 Greek Sources
 Great Synaxaristes:  7 ΙΑΝΟΥΑΡΙΟΥ. ΜΕΓΑΣ ΣΥΝΑΞΑΡΙΣΤΗΣ.
  Συναξαριστής. 7 Ιανουαρίου. ECCLESIA.GR. (H ΕΚΚΛΗΣΙΑ ΤΗΣ ΕΛΛΑΔΟΣ).

 Russian Sources
  20 января (7 января). Православная Энциклопедия под редакцией Патриарха Московского и всея Руси Кирилла (электронная версия). (Orthodox Encyclopedia - Pravenc.ru).
  7 января (ст.ст.) 20 января 2013 (нов. ст.) . Русская Православная Церковь Отдел внешних церковных связей. (DECR).

January in the Eastern Orthodox calendar